The 2019 Carlisle City Council election took place on 2 May 2019 to elect members of Carlisle City Council in England. This was on the same day as other local elections.

Following the election, a Conservative administration was formed.

Summary

Election result

|-

Ward results

Belah & Kingmoor

Botcherby & Harraby North

Brampton & Fellside

Cathedral & Castle

Currock & Upperby

Dalston & Burgh

Denton Holme & Morton South

Harraby South & Parklands

Longtown & The Border

Newtown & Morton North

Sandsfield & Morton West

Stanwix & Houghton

Wetheral & Corby

By-elections

The consultation on local reorganisation in Cumbria meant that Carlisle City Council elections did not go ahead as planned. However, elections for the vacant seats on local councils were still held due to the resignations of 3 Labour councillors. These were - Cathedral & Castle ward, Harraby South & Parklands and Newtown & Morton North city ward. The elections were held on Thursday 6 May 2021 which saw 2 Conservative Party gains in the City Council.

Following the death of UKIP councillor John Denholm, a by-election was held for Currock & Upperby. A by-election was held in Longtown and the Border following the death of Conservative councillor Valerie Tarbitt.

Cathedral and Castle

Harraby South and Parklands

Newtown and Morton North

Currock and Upperby

Longtown and the Border

References

2019 English local elections
2019
2010s in Cumbria